The 1976 United States presidential election in West Virginia took place on November 2, 1976, in West Virginia as part of the 1976 United States presidential election. The two major party candidates, Republican Gerald Ford and Democrat Jimmy Carter were the only candidates to appear on the state's ballot.

Carter won the state of West Virginia with 58.07 percent of the vote, carrying the state's 6 electoral votes. He had a 16.14 point margin over the incumbent President Ford. , this is the last election in which Putnam County, Mineral County, and Hampshire County voted for a Democratic presidential candidate.

Results

Results by county

References

West Virginia
1976
1976 West Virginia elections